Kritsada Piandit (Thai กฤษดา เพี้ยนดิษฐ์) (born 2 December 1971) is a Thai retired football defender who played for Thailand in the 1996 Asian Cup.

International goals

External links
 
 
 11v11.com

1971 births
Living people
Kritsada Piandit
Kritsada Piandit
1996 AFC Asian Cup players
Place of birth missing (living people)
Footballers at the 1998 Asian Games
Kritsada Piandit
Southeast Asian Games medalists in football
Association football defenders
Association football midfielders
Competitors at the 1993 Southeast Asian Games
Competitors at the 1995 Southeast Asian Games
Competitors at the 1997 Southeast Asian Games
Competitors at the 1999 Southeast Asian Games
Kritsada Piandit
Kritsada Piandit
Kritsada Piandit